The League of Catalonia–Catalan Liberal Party (LC–PLC) was a Catalonia-based party alliance established on 30 September 1976 by the Catalan Liberal League (LLC) and Democratic Action (AD) ahead of the 1977 Spanish general election. It aimed at constitutiting itself as the successor to the historical Regionalist League of Catalonia, and after its establishment the alliance adhered to the Federation of Democratic and Liberal Parties of Joaquín Garrigues Walker and, through it, to the Liberal International.

Electoral performance

Cortes Generales

Nationwide

Regional breakdown

References

Political parties in Catalonia
Political parties established in 1976
Political parties disestablished in 1977